Radkovec is a small village in the Pohorje Hills in the Municipality of Slovenska Bistrica in northeastern Slovenia. The area is part of the traditional region of Styria. It is now included with the rest of the municipality in the Drava Statistical Region.

History
Radkovec became a separate village in 2000, when it was administratively separated from Malo Tinje.

References

External links
Radkovec at Geopedia

Populated places in the Municipality of Slovenska Bistrica